Stipe Vrdoljak (born 2 August 1993) is a Croatian professional footballer who plays as a defender for NK Zrinski Jurjevac Punitovački.

References

External links
 

1993 births
Living people
Sportspeople from Osijek
Association football fullbacks
Croatian footballers
Delfino Pescara 1936 players
HNK Hajduk Split players
NK Novigrad players
AIK Fotboll players
NK Istra 1961 players
FC Koper players
NK Aluminij players
NK BSK Bijelo Brdo players
First Football League (Croatia) players
Allsvenskan players
Slovenian Second League players
Slovenian PrvaLiga players
Croatian expatriate footballers
Croatian expatriate sportspeople in Italy
Croatian expatriate sportspeople in Sweden
Croatian expatriate sportspeople in Slovenia
Expatriate footballers in Italy
Expatriate footballers in Sweden
Expatriate footballers in Slovenia